This is a list of current and former Roman Catholic churches in the Roman Catholic Diocese of San Bernardino. The diocese comprises Riverside and San Bernardino Counties in the Southern California. The diocese has 91 parishes, seven missions and five chapels. The mother church for the diocese is Our Lady of the Rosary Cathedral in San Bernardino.

Riverside County

City of Riverside

Coachella Valley

West County

Riverside County (other)

San Bernardino County

City of San Bernardino

Southwest County (I-10 corridor)

Victor Valley

San Bernardino National Forest

San Bernardino County (other)

References

 
San Bernardino